Chamatkarji is an important Jain temple located near Ranthambore Fort in the city of Sawai Madhopur in Rajasthan.

Architecture 

The temple complex is enclosed within a high parapet wall canopied by chhatris all round. The main shrine is structure situated in the centre of the complex. The ceiling of the temple is a domical structure with carvings of an inverted lotus. The temple entrance has foliated arch supported by pillars. The mulnayak of the temple is a white color idol of Rishabhanatha placed inside the garbhagriha of the temple. The temple features a pancharatha on the sikhara.

About temple 
Chamatkarji dates back to the early medieval period. The temple is dedicated to Rishabhanatha, the first Tirthankara of Jainism. 
The temple name is derived from the fact that deity here is famous for performing miracles (chamatkar). A fair is organised here on Sharad Purnima.

See also 
 Shri Mahaveer Ji temple
 Sanghiji

References

Citation

Sources

External links

Jain temples in Rajasthan